

297001–297100 

|-id=005
| 297005 Ellirichter ||  || Elli Richter (1945–2014), sister of Albert Heller, a member of the TOTAS amateur survey team, who first spotted this asteroid. || 
|-id=026
| 297026 Corton ||  || Aloxe-Corton, a French village situated directly north of Beaune, in the famous Burgundy vineyard region || 
|-id=082
| 297082 Bygott ||  || Kyle Bygott (born 1980) is an experienced flight software engineer at Ball Aerospace who developed and helps to operate the WISE/NEOWISE flight software. || 
|}

297101–297200 

|-id=161
| 297161 Subuchin ||  || Su Buqing (1902–2003), was an academician of Chinese Academy of Sciences, is the founder of differential geometry in China. He discovered the well-known "Su-Cone" and "Su-Chain", and systematically developed the theory of projective differential geometry. || 
|}

297201–297300 

|-bgcolor=#f2f2f2
| colspan=4 align=center | 
|}

297301–297400 

|-bgcolor=#f2f2f2
| colspan=4 align=center | 
|}

297401–297500 

|-id=409
| 297409 Mållgan ||  || Mållgan (Malcolm in English), the imaginary friend of the fictitious character Alfie Atkins (Alfons Åberg), created by Swedish author Gunilla Bergström. Many young children have imaginary friends, although they tend to be abandoned with time. The naming of Mållgan is a tribute to all imaginary friends. || 
|}

297501–297600 

|-bgcolor=#f2f2f2
| colspan=4 align=center | 
|}

297601–297700 

|-bgcolor=#f2f2f2
| colspan=4 align=center | 
|}

297701–297800 

|-bgcolor=#f2f2f2
| colspan=4 align=center | 
|}

297801–297900 

|-bgcolor=#f2f2f2
| colspan=4 align=center | 
|}

297901–298000 

|-bgcolor=#f2f2f2
| colspan=4 align=center | 
|}

References 

297001-298000